"Christians, awake, salute the happy morn" is an English Christmas hymn on a text by John Byrom. It is usually sung to the tune "Yorkshire" by John Wainright.

Text

The text of the hymn is from a poem in iambic pentameter by John Byrom. The original manuscript, in Chetham's Library, Manchester, bears the title "Christmas Day. For Dolly", referring to the author's daughter, although there is no evidence to support the oft repeated story that it was written for her specifically. The original poem was in three paragraphs of 16 lines each (for a total of 48). The exact date of this document is uncertain, although it is usually dated between 1745 and 1750. This was later published in the author's posthumous Poems, &c. (1773) and later again in his Works (1814, vol. ii).

The omission of some of the lines and re-arrangement of the remainder into singable verses appeared in combination with Wainwright's music in a 1766 publication, although the first printing for liturgical usage was Thomas Cotterill's Selection of Psalms and Hymns (1819, 8th ed.), retaken shortly thereafter in James Montgomery's Christian Psalmist (1825). The modern text, which runs to six verses of six lines, is frequently shortened, omitting one or two stanzas. The fifth verse ("Oh, may we keep and ponder in our mind") is sometimes replaced with an alternative one beginning "Like Mary let us ponder in our mind". A version by Davies Gilbert in 8 verses, printed in Some Ancient Christmas Carols (1823), stays more faithful to the original poem.

Verse 4 paraphrases the shepherds adoring the newborn Jesus.

Tune
The association with the tune "Yorkshire" (sometimes also "Stockport") is an early one: some accounts describe it being sung under the direction of its composer by a group of local men and boys for Christmas 1750, some time after the writing of the poem; although it is not possible to tell how the poem was originally divided along to the tune. The first edition that has it in combination with Byrom's text is in Wainwright's only known musical publication, undated but assumed from newspaper announcements to have been published in 1766.

The melody was first published in the Collection of Tunes (1761) by Caleb Ashworth from Lancashire, who presumably "heard and liked" the tune, but as a setting for the paraphrase of Psalm 50 by Isaac Watts, beginning "The God of Glory sends his Summons forth, / Calls the South Nations, and awakes the North". The melody was again reprinted by another Lancashire churchman, Ralph Harrison, in his Sacred Harmony (1784): the popularity of this publication made the tune widely known, including across the Atlantic, although it is unlikely it was much sung by American congregations at the time. In England Byrom’s hymn was sung frequently as an outdoors carol, but it did not make its way into liturgical use until the 1819 publication by Cotterill.

From thence it had passed by the beginning of the 20th century into most hymnals in common use, both in England and America, including Hymns Ancient and Modern, the English Hymnal, and many others thereafter.

See also
 List of Christmas carols

References

Notes

Sources
, cited in 
 [reprint c. 1835]

, cited in

External links
"Christians, Awake, Salute the Happy Morn (Yorkshire)" sung by the Choir of King's College, Cambridge (arr. Stephen Cleobury)

Christmas carols
Poems
Religious music
Hymns in The English Hymnal